John D. Anthony (born April 13, 1976) was a member of the Illinois House of Representatives, who represented the 75th district from August 2013 to June 2016. The district he represents includes all or parts of Minooka, Channahon, Joliet, Morris, Seneca, Marseilles, Sheridan and Plano. He was the first African American Republican member of the Illinois General Assembly since the Cutback Amendment came into effect in 1983.

Anthony resigned from the Illinois House of Representatives on June 17, 2016 to take a position with the Illinois Department of Corrections.

References

External links
 Representative John D. Anthony (R) 75th District at the Illinois General Assembly
 
 Biography at Ballotpedia

Republican Party members of the Illinois House of Representatives
Living people
Politicians from Chicago
African-American state legislators in Illinois
1976 births
People from Joliet, Illinois
African-American police officers
American police officers
21st-century African-American people
20th-century African-American people